Valenzuela corsicus is a species of Psocoptera from Caeciliusidae family that can be found in Austria, Corsica, Croatia, Cyprus, France, Germany, Greece, Italy, Portugal, Spain, Sweden, Switzerland, and the Netherlands. They also can be found in Near East.

References 

Caeciliusidae
Insects described in 1882
Taxa named by Hermann Julius Kolbe
Psocoptera of Europe